Bongsan Art Fair is a festival in Daegu, South Korea.
The festival, which is held in mid-October, is also the county's only art festival. The Bongsan Art Festival is held simultaneously at 16 art galleries within Bongsan Culture Street and offers a wide range of genres (Oriental paintings, Western paintings, sculpture, crafts, calligraphy works, and installations) for more than 30 artists.

The festival also offers a wide range of attractions, including a celebration performance, a lecture meeting, and a contact event with a writer.

External links

See also
List of festivals in South Korea
List of festivals in Asia

External links

Arts festivals in South Korea
Fairs in South Korea
Tourist attractions in Daegu
Art fairs
Annual events in South Korea
Art festivals in South Korea
Festivals in Daegu
Autumn events in South Korea